The wrestling tournament at the 1951 Mediterranean Games was held in Alexandria, Egypt.

Medalists

Freestyle

Greco-Roman

Medal table

References
1951 Mediterranean Games report at the International Committee of Mediterranean Games (CIJM) website
List of Olympians who won medals at the Mediterranean Games at Olympedia.org

Medi
Wrestling
1951